Meredithville is an unincorporated community located in Brunswick County, in the U.S. state of Virginia.

St. Paul's Chapel School was listed on the National Register of Historic Places in 2004.

References

Unincorporated communities in Virginia
Unincorporated communities in Brunswick County, Virginia